Colotes of Lampsacus (Kolōtēs Lampsakēnos; c. 320 – after 268 BC) was a pupil of Epicurus. 
He wrote a work to prove "That it is impossible even to live according to the doctrines of the other philosophers" and dedicated it toPtolemy II Philadelphus. Although this work is lost, its arguments are preserved in two works written by Plutarch in refutation of it: "That it is impossible even to live pleasantly according to Epicurus", and Against Colotes. According to Plutarch, Colotes attacked Socrates and other great philosophers in this work. Some fragments of two other works of Colotes have been discovered at the Villa of the Papyri at Herculaneum: Against Plato's Lysis, and Against Plato's Euthydemus. According to Plutarch, Colotes, upon hearing Epicurus discourse on the nature of things, fell on his knees before him, and besought Epicurus to give him instruction. Cicero also recounts that Colotes held that it is unworthy of the truthfulness of a philosopher to use fables in his teaching, a notion which Cicero opposes.

Notes

References

3rd-century BC Greek people
3rd-century BC philosophers
320s BC births
3rd-century BC deaths
Epicurean philosophers
Hellenistic-era philosophers from Anatolia
Ptolemaic court
People from Lampsacus